The Staatstheater Braunschweig is a theatre company and opera house in Braunschweig, Germany, presenting and producing music theatre (opera, operetta, musical), Tanztheater, theatre, Theatre for Young Audiences and concerts.

The Staatstheater Braunschweig is owned by the State of Lower Saxony.

History 
The earliest incarnation of the Staatstheater Braunschweig was the Opernhaus am Hagenmarkt in Braunschweig, founded in 1690 by Duke Anthony Ulrich of Brunswick-Wolfenbüttel. Theatre works such as Emilia Galotti by Lessing and Goethe's Faust had their first openings in Braunschweig.

Gallery

Intendants

 1925–29: Ludwig Neubeck
 1929–33: Thur Himmighoffen
 1933–34: Oskar Walleck
 1934–45: Alexander Schum
 1945–46: Jost Dahmen
 1946–47: Heinrich Voigt
 1947–51: Walter Bruno Iltz
 1951–61: Hermann Kühn
 1961–63: Erich Kriebig
 1964–67: Helmuth Matiasek
 1967–68: Hermann Kühn
 1968–72: Hans Peter Doll
 1972–79: Chritoph Groszer
 1979–91: Mario Krüger
 1991–93: Hans Peter Doll
 1993–94: Jürgen Flügge
 1995–97: Executive directors: Brigitte Fassbaender, Philippe Auguin, Tatjana Rese
 1997–2010: Wolfgang Gropper
 2010–2017: Joachim Klement
 2017–current: Dagmar Schlingmann

References

External links 
  

Braunschweig
Braunschweig
Duchy of Brunswick
Buildings and structures in Braunschweig
Culture in Braunschweig
Music in Braunschweig
Organisations based in Braunschweig
Braunschweig
1861 establishments in Germany
19th-century establishments in the Duchy of Brunswick
Theatres completed in 1861
Music venues completed in 1861